Malik Mohammad Qayyum (18 January 1944 – 17 February 2023) was a Pakistani lawyer who was Senior Advocate Supreme Court and Attorney General of Pakistan. He was replaced by Senator Latif Khosa when President Pervez Musharraf resigned on 18 August 2008. He became Attorney General following the resignation of Makhdoom Ali Khan. He was a Judge of the Lahore High Court, which he resigned from after a phone transcript of his was released in which he was alleged to be approached by the then Prime Minister Nawaz Sharif's government to fix judgement in a case before him involving Benazir Bhutto. Qayyum denied that the voice in the telephone conversation was his. Agencies have examined the tapes and have expressed their concern that they could have been doctored although no final verdict is available.

Qayyum was a senior lawyer of the Supreme Court of Pakistan and advised the sitting benches of the Higher Judiciary on constitutional issues. He was responsible for conducting the inquiry into match fixing which was lauded by the ICC known as the "Qayyum Report".

Qayyum was the son of Justice Malik Muhammad Akram Arain and brother of Dr Mian Javed Akram (PIMS) and late former Minister for Commerce Muhammad Pervaiz Malik.

Qayyum died on 17 February 2023 in Lahore, at the age of 79. He was buried in the Miani Sahib graveyard.

Judicial career 
Qayyum was the subject of controversy as a judge of the Lahore High Court. During Prime Minister Nawaz Sharif's recommend term in office (1997–99), the then Chief of Ehtesab [Accountability] Cell, Saif ur Rehman, filed cases against members of the Pakistan Peoples Party [PPP], including high-profile cases of alleged corruption by former premier Benazir Bhutto and her husband Asif Ali Zardari, before Qayyum. Qayyum rejected pre-arrest bails, terminated temporary injunctions, and granted permissions of FIRs against PPP-connected persons and senior officers.

Qayyum was a nominated judge on Ehtesab Bench of the Lahore High Court. The PPP said Qayyum, whose brother, Pervaiz Malik, was a sitting MNA from PM Sharif's Pakistan Muslim League, was biased. Malik was given an unopposed seat of the National Assembly vacated by the Prime Minister from Lahore.

Qayyum also said that the 2008 Pakistani general election was going to be rigged.  On 10 March 2008 he rejected a plan by opposition lawmakers to reinstate the country's ousted Supreme Court justices within 30 days of parliament's first session, on the grounds that President Musharraf's dismissal of the judges was legal under the constitution.

References

1944 births
2023 deaths
Pakistani lawyers
Pakistani judges
Attorneys General of Pakistan
People named in the Panama Papers
People from Lahore